is a Japanese former professional baseball pitcher. He played in Nippon Professional Baseball (NPB) for 19 seasons for the Hiroshima Toyo Carp and Yomiuri Giants.

Career
In , Hiroshima Toyo Carp selected him in the first round.

Otake represented the Japan national baseball team at the 2000 World Junior Baseball Championship and 2019 WBSC Premier12.

On October 24, 2021, Otake announced his retirement from professional baseball. In 19 seasons in NPB for the Hiroshima Toyo Carp and Yomiuri Giants, Otake recorded a 102-101 record with a 3.77 ERA and 1,186 strikeouts in 376 total appearances.

References

External links

1983 births
Living people
Hiroshima Toyo Carp players
Japanese baseball players
Nippon Professional Baseball pitchers
Baseball people from Saitama Prefecture
Yomiuri Giants players
2019 WBSC Premier12 players
Japanese baseball coaches
Nippon Professional Baseball coaches